Harry J. Boykoff (July 24, 1922  – February 20, 2001) was a professional American basketball player. During his career he was often referred to as "Heshie", Big Hesh", and "Big Boy".

Early life

Boykoff was born on the Lower East Side, grew up in the Brownsville neighborhood of Brooklyn, New York, and was Jewish.

Basketball career

Boykoff played high school basketball for Thomas Jefferson High School in Brooklyn, and college basketball for St. John's University (New York City), where he was an All American three years in a row.

In a 1947 game at Madison Square Garden, while playing for St John's, he scored 54 points, more than the combined total of the opposing team.

Boykoff led St John's to the 1943 National Invitation Tournament championship. He was awarded the MVP Award, and was named on several All-American teams. He received a gold basketball emblematic of his selection on the All-America basketball team appearing in The Sporting News, a national sports newspaper.

He played for the Waterloo Hawks (1949–50), Boston Celtics and Tri-Cities Blackhawks (1950–51) in the National Basketball Association for a total of 109 games.

In his 1948–49 season for Waterloo, Boykoff's shooting average (41.3%) was the fourth-highest in the league.

While playing for the Celtics, he was the highest paid NBA player, at around $15,000 per year.

He became so proficient at blocking shots that because of his play, the rules of the game were changed to prevent shots being blocked on their way down toward the basket (goaltending).

Personal
Even with his outstanding record, Boykoff remained humble. He was quoted as saying:

I'm not an athlete, I'm just a big guy and a lucky one.

Later in life Boykoff appeared in films and television shows such as Star Trek, Frasier, Town & Country, The Crew, on McDonald's cups and commercials, and a few others.

Boykoff died in California at age 78 of lung cancer.

Career statistics

NBA
Source

Regular season

See also
 List of select Jewish basketball players

References

External links

Jews in Sports
https://www.nytimes.com/2001/04/15/sports/harry-boykoff-78-st-john-s-star-in-the-1940-s-dies.html?pagewanted=2
 

1922 births
2001 deaths
All-American college men's basketball players
American men's basketball players
Basketball players from New York City
Boston Celtics players
Deaths from lung cancer in California
Centers (basketball)
International Jewish Sports Hall of Fame inductees
Jewish American sportspeople
Jewish men's basketball players
Sportspeople from Brooklyn
St. John's Red Storm men's basketball players
Thomas Jefferson High School (Brooklyn) alumni
Toledo Jeeps players
Tri-Cities Blackhawks players
Undrafted National Basketball Association players
Waterloo Hawks players
20th-century American Jews